Schools named New Town High School include:

 New Town High School (Maryland), Maryland, United States
 New Town High School (North Dakota), North Dakota, United States
 New Town High School (Tasmania), Tasmania, Australia